Dari Mart is a chain of convenience stores located in the U.S. state of Oregon. Dari Mart has 44 stores (as of 2019) located exclusively within the Willamette Valley of Oregon, from Albany to Cottage Grove. It is most notable as a supplier of milk, ice cream, and other dairy products from Lochmead Farms, one of the largest independent dairy farms in the Pacific Northwest. Most store locations are in the Eugene-Springfield metropolitan area in Lane County, Oregon, while several stores are located in rural communities in Lane, Linn and Benton Counties. The company has started selling dairy products internationally as well.

In 2014 the company began expanding beyond the convenience store model and opened Dari Market (Store #50) in Pleasant Hill, the first location to offer full-service grocery shopping.

History
The first Dari Mart store opened in 1965 as a way to market the farm's dairy products. Gladys and Howard Gibson established Lochmead Farms in 1941, and has been owned for three generations by the Gibson family of Junction City, Oregon. Today, about 20 Gibson/Straube family members spread across three generations work with the Dari Mart and Lochmead Farm companies. Portraits of family members' children playing on hay bales, with young farm animals, etc. are featured prominently in most store locations.

References

External links
 
 Hoover's Business information listing for Dari Mart

Benton County, Oregon
Companies based in Oregon
Convenience stores of the United States
Retail companies established in 1965
Junction City, Oregon
Linn County, Oregon
Lane County, Oregon
Privately held companies based in Oregon
1965 establishments in Oregon